The Černý potok is a tributary on the left side of the river Smědá in Liberec District in Liberec Region, Czech Republic. The stream flows for 5.1 km, with a basin area measuring 6.7 km ².

The stream rises on the northern slopes of Černé Mountain (1085 m) in the Jizera Mountains at an altitude of 1035 m. The average flow at the mouth is 0.16 m³ / s. It flows mainly north. During its relatively short flow creates innumerable waterfalls and cascades. The outflow rushes through a stream northwards through, where there is the forest, dividing into several branches to the Strašice.

References

Rivers of the Liberec Region